The Sunshine Motorway is a thirty-three kilometre Australian motorway on the Sunshine Coast region of Queensland, just north of Brisbane. It was initially a tolled motorway before these were removed in 1996 after excessive complaints regarding the need of a toll. It is part of State Route 70, which extends north a further 12.3 kilometres to Noosaville. For completeness, and to aid in understanding of the usage of this road, the extension is included in this article.

Overview

The Sunshine Motorway is unusual in as much as it is a low budget motorway and also because it changes direction dramatically from east–west to north–south at the Nicklin Way interchange. It starts at the interchange with the Bruce Highway at Palmview continuing east past Sippy Downs and Mountain Creek where it then meets the Nicklin Way and heads North to end at the Emu Mountain Road near Peregian Beach. Because it is low budget, most of the traffic travels in only one lane in each direction, however from the Bruce Highway to Kawana Way and from the Nicklin Way to the Mudjimba/David Low Way exit it is dual carriageway. Towns along the motorway include Mooloolaba and Maroochydore, both of which are known for being holiday spots

The Queensland State Government has committed to spending a large amount of money on duplication sections of the Sunshine Motorway, due to significant growth within the area. The latest upgrade was completed in 2008, along with the Maroochydore Road upgrade.

Construction

Stage One of the motorway (Bruce Highway to Pacific Paradise) opened on 20 January 1990. This section contained three toll booths, and was completely grade-separated.

Stage Two of the motorway (Pacific Paradise to Peregian Springs) was officially opened on 29 December 1993. Unlike Stage One, this section did not include toll booths, but did pass through two large roundabouts. Emu Mountain Road was realigned and reconstructed to carry motorway traffic to Eumundi-Noosa, on which work was completed in October 1993.

After much public displeasure, the Queensland Government officially ceased tolling on midnight of 8 March 1996.

On 28 April 2006 a new road opened between Eumarella Road and Eenie Creek Road at Noosaville, taking State Route 70 along with it. The road was named Walter Hay Drive.

Future upgrades

As the Sunshine Coast continues to grow, more and more stress is placed upon the Motorway from the added weight of the population. During peak hours, most interchanges along the single-carriageway section of the Motorway acquire congestion. To remedy this problem, Main Roads Queensland are currently planning and constructing various new sections of the Motorway, under a plan called SM2032. These constructions mainly include upgrading to dual carriageway along the more populated areas through which the motorway passes; other constructions included the Maroochy River Bridge duplication (completed in 2008) and various safety measures throughout the entire length of the motorway.

As of 2010, the entire freeway from Mooloolaba to Pacific Paradise is four lane dual-carriageway motorway. There is still a two-lane section between Kawana Way and Nicklin Way, and north of Pacific Paradise is also still two lanes.

A A$320 million project to upgrade the intersection of the Sunshine Motorway with the Nicklin Way is planned for construction from 2022 to 2025.

Planning has begun (in 2021) to upgrade a  section of the Sunshine Motorway from Pacific Paradise to Coolum Beach from two lanes to four. A budget of $1.75 million has been allocated for this planning.

A project to plan for a future upgrade of the interchange to Maroochy Boulevard, at a cost of $1.6 million, was to complete in late 2022.

Major intersections
NOTE: The Sunshine Motorway is not a motorway standard road. It is an inter-urban road with many intersections of varying degrees of importance, depending how this is measured. In addition to the 11 intersections listed below there are about 6 more not listed, which may be considered by some readers to be major intersections.

See also

 Freeways in Australia
 Freeways in Sunshine Coast

References

Highways in Queensland
Sunshine Coast, Queensland
Two-lane expressways
Former toll roads in Australia
Articles containing potentially dated statements from 2008